Dr. Martha Jee Wong, born Martha Jee,(1939–) is a Texas politician who was the first Asian American woman to be elected to the Texas House of Representatives, representing Houston's District 134. She served from 2002 to 2006 as a Republican. Moreover, she was the first Asian American woman part of Texas Spirits, an honorary  spirit, service, and social organization on the campus of University of Texas at Austin. Texas Spirits is the oldest spirit organization at the University of Texas, founded in 1941.

History
Wong was born at St. Joseph Hospital in January 1939.

Wong lived in the Houston Heights, initially within her parents' grocery business and later. She attended Hogg Junior High School, and then Reagan High School (now Heights High School) in Houston. In 1993, she became the Houston City Council's first elected Asian American Councilwoman, and was elected to three successive terms. She earned a bachelor's degree from the University of Texas and both a master's degree and doctorate from the University of Houston.

See also

 Gordon Quan
 History of the Chinese Americans in Houston

References

External links
 Wong, Martha and Louis Marciafava. Martha Wong Oral History, Houston Oral History Project.
 Audio
 Audio Part 1
 Audio Part 2
 Uncorrected Transcript part 1 (Archive) - June 18, 2008
 Oral Histories from the Houston History Project - Wong, Martha - Interviewed by Uzma Quraishi, transcribed by Suzanne Mascola. January 23, 2007
Transcript of interview (Archive of PDF)
 Transcript Index (Archive of PDF)
 Audio Part 1 (Archive of Audio File)
 Audio Part 2 (Archive of Audio File)
 Audio Part 3 (Archive of Audio File)
Staff. "Campaign Notebook." Houston Chronicle. Saturday January 11, 1997. A30.

|-

Living people
American politicians of Chinese descent
Republican Party members of the Texas House of Representatives
Houston City Council members
Women city councillors in Texas
21st-century American politicians
21st-century American women politicians
Asian-American city council members
Asian-American people in Texas politics
Women state legislators in Texas
1939 births
Asian conservatism in the United States